The glass frogs belong to the amphibian family Centrolenidae (order Anura). While the general background coloration of most glass frogs is primarily lime green, the abdominal skin of some members of this family is transparent and translucent, giving the glass frog its common name. The internal viscera, including the heart, liver, and gastrointestinal tract, are visible through the skin. When active their blood makes them visible; when sleeping most of the blood is concealed in the liver, hiding them. Glass frogs are arboreal, living mainly in trees, and only come out for mating season. Their transparency conceals them very effectively when sleeping on a green leaf, as they habitually do.

Taxonomy 
The first described species of Centrolenidae was the "giant" Centrolene geckoideum, named by Marcos Jiménez de la Espada in 1872, based on a specimen collected in northeastern Ecuador. Several species were described in subsequent years by different herpetologists (including G. A. Boulenger, G. K. Noble, and E. H. Taylor), but usually placed together with the tree frogs in the genera Hylella or Hyla.

The family Centrolenidae was proposed by Edward H. Taylor in 1945. Between the 1950s and 1970s, most species of glass frogs were known from Central America, particularly from Costa Rica and Panama, where Taylor, Julia F., and Jay M. Savage extensively worked, and just a few species were known to occur in South America. In 1973, John D. Lynch and William E. Duellman published a large revision of the glass frogs from Ecuador, showing the species richness of Centrolenidae was particularly concentrated in the Andes. Later contributions by authors such as Juan Rivero, Savage, William Duellman, John D. Lynch, Pedro Ruiz-Carranza, and José Ayarzagüena increased the number of described taxa, especially from Central America, Venezuela, Colombia, Ecuador, and Peru.

The evolutionary relationships, biogeography, and character evolution of centrolenids were discussed by Guayasamin et al. (2008) Glass frogs originated in South America and dispersed multiple times into Central America. Character evolution seems to be complex, with multiple gains and/or losses of humeral spines, reduced hand webbing, and complete ventral transparency.

The taxonomical classification of the glass frogs has been problematic. In 1991, after a major revision of the species and taxonomic characters, the herpetologists Pedro Ruiz-Carranza and John D. Lynch published a proposal for a taxonomic classification of the Centrolenidae based on cladistic principles and defining monophyletic groups. That paper was the first of a series of contributions dealing with the glass frogs from Colombia that led them to describe almost 50 species of glass frogs. The genus Centrolene was proposed to include the species with a humeral spine in adult males, and the genus Hyalinobatrachium to include the species with a bulbous liver. However, they left a heterogeneous group of species in the genus Cochranella, defined just by lacking a humeral spine and a bulbous liver. Since the publication of the extensive revision of the Colombian glass frogs, several other publications have dealt with the glass frogs from Venezuela, Costa Rica, and Ecuador.

In 2006, the genus Nymphargus was erected for the species with basal webbing among outer fingers (part of the previous Cochranella ocellata species group).

Four genera (Centrolene, Cochranella, Hyalinobatrachium, Nymphargus) have been shown to be poly- or paraphyletic and recently a new taxonomy has been proposed (see below).

Classification 
The family Centrolenidae is a clade of anurans. Previously, the family was considered closely related to the family Hylidae; however, recent phylogenetic studies have placed them (and their sister taxon, the family Allophrynidae) closer to the family Leptodactylidae.

The monophyly of Centrolenidae is supported by morphological and behavioral characters, including: 1) presence of a dilated process on the medial side of the third metacarpal (an apparently unique synapomorphy); 2) ventral origin of the musculus flexor teres digiti III relative to the musculus transversi metacarpi I; 3) terminal phalanges T-shaped; 4) exotroph, lotic, burrower/fossorial tadpoles with a vermiform body and dorsal C-shaped eyes, that live buried within leaf packs in still or flowing water systems; and 5) eggs clutches deposited outside of water on vegetation or rocks above still or flowing water systems. Several molecular synapomorphies also support the monophyly of the clade.

The taxonomic classification of the Centrolenidae was recently modified. The family now contains two subfamilies and 12 genera.

Genera
 Subfamily Centroleninae
 Genus Centrolene Jiménez de la Espada, 1872
 Genus Chimerella Guayasamin, Castroviejo, Trueb, Ayarzagüena, Rada, Vilá, 2009
 Genus Cochranella Taylor, 1951
 Genus Espadarana Guayasamin, Castroviejo, Trueb, Ayarzagüena, Rada, Vilá, 2009
 Genus Nymphargus Cisneros-Heredia & McDiarmid, 2007
 Genus Rulyrana Guayasamin, Castroviejo, Trueb, Ayarzagüena, Rada, Vilá, 2009
 Genus Sachatamia Guayasamin, Castroviejo, Trueb, Ayarzagüena, Rada, Vilá, 2009
 Genus Teratohyla Taylor, 1951
 Genus Vitreorana Guayasamin, Castroviejo, Trueb, Ayarzagüena, Rada, Vilá, 2009
 Genus incertae sedis 
 "Centrolene" acanthidiocephalum (Ruiz-Carranza and Lynch, 1989)
 "Centrolene" azulae (Flores and McDiarmid, 1989)
 "Centrolene" guanacarum Ruiz-Carranza and Lynch, 1995
 "Centrolene" medemi (Cochran and Goin, 1970)
 "Centrolene" petrophilum Ruiz-Carranza and Lynch, 1991
 "Centrolene" quindianum Ruiz-Carranza and Lynch, 1995
 "Centrolene" robledoi Ruiz-Carranza and Lynch, 1995
 "Cochranella" duidaeana (Ayarzagüena, 1992)
 "Cochranella" euhystrix (Cadle and McDiarmid, 1990)
 "Cochranella" geijskesi (Goin, 1966)
 "Cochranella" megista (Rivero, 1985)
 "Cochranella" ramirezi Ruiz-Carranza and Lynch, 1991
 "Cochranella" riveroi (Ayarzagüena, 1992)
 "Cochranella" xanthocheridia Ruiz-Carranza and Lynch, 1995
 Subfamily Hyalinobatrachinae
 Genus Celsiella Guayasamin, Castroviejo, Trueb, Ayarzagüena, Rada, Vilá, 2009
 Genus Hyalinobatrachium Ruiz-Carranza & Lynch, 1991 – "True" Glass Frogs
 Subfamily incertae sedis 
Ikakogi Guayasamin, Castroviejo, Trueb, Ayarzagüena, Rada, Vilá, 2009

Camouflage
The evolutionary advantage of a partly clear skin and an opaque back was a mystery, as it did not seem to be effective as camouflage. It was found that the colour of the frog's body changed little against darker or lighter foliage, but the legs were more translucent and consequently changed in brightness. By resting with the translucent legs surrounding the body, the frog's edge appears softer, with less brightness gradient from the leaf to the legs and from the legs to the body, making the outline less noticeable. This camouflage phenomenon, in which the frog's edges are softened to match the relative brightness of its surroundings, is referred to as edge diffusion. Experiments with computer-generated images and gelatine models of opaque and translucent frogs found that the translucent frogs were less visible, and were attacked by birds significantly less often. It was found in 2022 that these frogs have the ability to conceal red blood cells concentrated inside their livers, increasing transparency when they are vulnerable. While this would cause massive clotting in most animals (including humans), glass frogs are able regulate the location, density, and packing of red cells without clotting. The findings could advance medical understanding of dangerous blood clotting.

Characteristics
They appear light green in color over most of their bodies, except for the skin along the lower surface of the body and legs, which are transparent or translucent. The glass frog's transparent skin allows an external view of the viscera—the internal organs present in the body's main cavity—making it so observers can witness the frog's internal processes, such as the heart beating and pumping blood through its arteries. Patterning of glass frogs is varied amongst different species, while some appear as a uniform green color, others display spots that range from yellow to white, mimicking the coloration of their eggs. 

Their digit tips are expanded, allowing them to climb, thus allowing most to live in elevated areas along forest streams, such as trees and shrubs. 

Glass frogs are similar in appearance to some green frogs of the genus Eleutherodactylus and to some tree frogs of the family Hylidae. However, hylid tree frogs have eyes that face to the side, whilst those of glass frogs face forward.

Two members of the glass-frog family Centrolenidae: Centrolenella fleischmanni, now called Hyalinobatrachium fleischmanni, and C. prosoblepon, and of the hylid subfamily Phyllomedusinae: Agalychnis moreletii and Pachymedusa dacnicolor, reflect near-infrared light (700 to 900 nanometers) when examined by infrared color photography. Infrared reflectance may confer adaptive advantage to these arboreal frogs both in thermoregulation and infrared cryptic coloration.

Lifecycle

Mating 
Mating begins by the call of a male tree frog, who is perched either on the underside or top of a leaf over a lake edge or a stream. Once a female has responded to the male's call, mating begins on the leaf in the amplexus physical position, in which the male wraps his arms around the female and attaches himself to her back. Once the physical mating process has concluded, the female produces her eggs onto the leaf before departing, leaving the male to defend the newly-laid eggs against predators. Males will occasionally call for and mate with other females on the same leaf, establishing a multitude of different developmentally-staged egg clutches to guard.

Tadpoles 
Once the tadpoles, the frog aquatic larval stage, have been hatched, they fall from their original position on the leaf into the water below. When living in the water the tadpoles feed on the leaf litter and streamside detritus until undergoing metamorphosis to become a froglet.

Conservation

Predators 
A main predator on the glass frog in its tadpole stage are "frog flies", which lay their eggs within the frog eggs; after hatching the maggots feed on the embryos of the glass frogs.

Protection
All glass frogs are protected under the Convention on International Trade in Endangered Species (CITES) meaning that international trade (including in parts and derivatives) is regulated by the CITES permitting system.

Distribution

The Centrolenidae are a diverse family, distributed from southern Mexico to Panama, and through the Andes from Venezuela and the island of Tobago to Bolivia, with some species in the Amazon and Orinoco River basins, the Guiana Shield region, southeastern Brazil, and northern Argentina.

Biology
Glass frogs are mostly arboreal. They live along rivers and streams during the breeding season, and are particularly diverse in montane cloud forests of Central and South America, although some species occur also in Amazon and Chocóan rainforest and semideciduous forests.

Hyalinobatrachium valerioi glass frogs are carnivores, their diet mainly including small insects like crickets, moths, flies, spiders, and other smaller frogs.

The eggs are usually deposited on the leaves of trees or shrubs hanging over the running water of mountain streams, creeks, and small rivers. One species leaves its eggs over stones close to waterfalls. The method of egg-laying on the leaf varies between species. The males usually call from leaves close to their egg clutches. These eggs are less vulnerable to predators than those laid within water, but are affected by the parasitic maggots of some fly species. Some glass frogs show parental care: in many species, glass frog females brood their eggs during the night the eggs are fertilized, which improves the survival of the eggs, while in almost a third of species, glass frog males stay on guard for much longer periods. After they hatch, the tadpoles fall into the waters below. The tadpoles are elongated, with powerful tails and low fins, suited for fast-flowing water. Outside of the breeding season, some species live in the canopy.

References

 
 Kubicki, Brian. Ranas De Vidrio – Costa Rica – Glass Frogs (2007). In Spanish and English. ..
 Barnet et al. (2020). Imperfect transparency and camouflage in glass frogs. PNAS. 117, 23.

External links

 Amphibian Species of the World
 Centrolenidae in AmphibiaWeb Ecuador
 Centrolenidae in AmphibiaWeb
 Glassfrogs (Centrolenidae) Project
 Centrolenidae in the Tree of Life site
 Centrolenidae in ITIS
 Research on Centrolenidae
 Centrolenidae in Livingunderworld.org
 Centrolenidae in Animal Diversity Web
 Centrolenidae en InfoNatura 
 Fleischmann’s glass frog at National Geographic 
 Various Frog Species

 
Neotropical realm fauna